"Last Beautiful Girl" is a song by American rock band Matchbox Twenty. It was released as the fifth and final single from their second album, Mad Season (2000), reaching number 20 on the Billboard Adult Top 40 chart and number 96 on the UK Singles Chart.

Content
The narrator is reflecting on a relationship gone bad and a girl who knew all the right things to say at all the wrong times.

Track listing
 European maxi-CD single
 "Last Beautiful Girl"
 "Push" (live)
 "Bent" (live)

Charts

Weekly charts

Year-end charts

Release history

References

2000 songs
2001 singles
Atlantic Records singles
Lava Records singles
Matchbox Twenty songs
Song recordings produced by Matt Serletic
Songs written by Matt Serletic
Songs written by Rob Thomas (musician)